The Devereux-Coleman House, also known as the Coleman-Hogan House, in Milledgeville in Baldwin County, Georgia, was listed on the National Register of Historic Places in 1993.

Description and history 
It is a two-story, wood-framed I-House with wings that make a U-shape, all connected by a front porch. It was built in 1834 as a one-story central hallway-plan house, and the second floor was added in 1840. The wings and connecting front porch were built in 1887. It has Folk Victorian details.

The entire house was moved about 20 miles to its current location in 1981, from its original rural location in Hancock County.

References

Houses on the National Register of Historic Places in Georgia (U.S. state)
Houses in Baldwin County, Georgia
Houses completed in 1820
National Register of Historic Places in Baldwin County, Georgia